Andriy Borysyuk is a retired Ukrainian footballer who played as a forward.

Career
Andriy Borysyuk started his career in 1992 at the Nyva Vinnytsia where he played 11 matches and scored 2 goals. Here he won the Ukrainian First League in the season 1992–93. In 1994 he played 4 matches with Nyva Vinnytsia and 27 matches with Nyva Vinnytsia. Here he got into the final of Ukrainian Cup in the season 1995–96. In summer 1996 he moved to Desna Chernihiv, the main club of the city of Chernihiv, where he won the Ukrainian Second League in the season 1996–97. In 1998 he moved to Fortuna Sharhorod.

Honours
Desna Chernihiv
 Ukrainian Second League: 1996–97

Nyva Vinnytsia
 Ukrainian First League: 1992–93
 Ukrainian Cup: Runner-Up 1995–96

References

External links 
 Andriy Borysyuk footballfacts.ru
 Andriy Borysyuk allplayers.in.ua

1975 births
Living people
FC Desna Chernihiv players
FC Nyva Vinnytsia players
FC Polissya Zhytomyr players
FC Uzhhorod players
FC Fortuna Sharhorod players
Ukrainian footballers
Ukrainian Premier League players
Ukrainian First League players
Ukrainian Second League players
Association football midfielders